The system of academic degrees at the University of Oxford can be confusing to those not familiar with it. This is not merely because many degree titles date from the Middle Ages, but also because many changes have been haphazardly introduced in recent years. For example, the (medieval) BD, BM, BCL, etc. are postgraduate degrees, while the (modern) MPhys, MEng, etc. are integrated master's degrees, requiring three years of undergraduate study before the postgraduate year.

In postnominals, "University of Oxford" is normally abbreviated "Oxon.", which is short for (Academia) Oxoniensis: e.g., MA (Oxon.), although within the university itself the abbreviation "Oxf" can be used.

Undergraduate Awards
 Bachelor of Arts (BA)
 Bachelor of Fine Art (BFA)

The bachelor's degree is awarded soon after the end of the degree course (three or four years after matriculation). Contrary to common UK practice, Oxford does not award bachelor's degrees with honours; however, a student whose degree is classified third class or higher is considered "to have achieved honours status".

Until recently, all undergraduates studied for the degree of Bachelor of Arts. The BFA was introduced in 1978. Holders of the degrees of BA and BFA both proceed in time to the degree of Master of Arts (MA). Note that the BA is still awarded even for some science courses, such as the three-year Physics degree which also still adheres to the traditional degree classification structure, with only 30% of candidates being awarded an upper second class honours or above. The degree of Bachelor of Science (BSc) has never been awarded as an undergraduate degree at Oxford; it used to be awarded as a graduate qualification, however.

 Bachelor of Theology (BTh) 
 Bachelor of Education (BEd)

The BTh is awarded primarily to students of the various theological colleges and halls, such as Wycliffe Hall, Regent's Park College, Blackfriars, St Stephen's House, Ripon College Cuddesdon and the former Westminster College, Oxford. Usually, these students are candidates for the ordained ministry of one of the mainstream Christian denominations, but may be drawn from any faith background or none at the discretion of the College or Hall. It should not be confused with the degree of bachelor of divinity (BD), which is a postgraduate degree.

The BEd was formerly awarded to students residing at Westminster College, Culham College of Education, the Lady Spencer Churchill College of Education, and Milton Keynes College of Education (formerly the North Buckinghamshire College of Education) who read concurrently at the university.

 Undergraduate Advanced Diploma (UGAdvDip) 
The UGAdvDip is a FHEQ Level 6 award which is equivalent to the third year of undergraduate study and it is generally accepted as equivalent to a second bachelor's degree or a Graduate Diploma. Undergraduate Advanced Diplomas are only offered at the University of Cambridge and the University of Oxford.

Undergraduate Master's degrees
In the 1990s the following degrees were introduced to increase public recognition of the four-year undergraduate science programmes in these subjects:

 Master of Biochemistry (MBiochem)
 Master of Chemistry (MChem)
 Master of Computer Science (MCompSci)
 Master of Computer Science and Philosophy (MCompSciPhil), first entry 2012
 Master of Earth Sciences (MEarthSc)
 Master of Engineering (MEng)
 Master of Mathematics (MMath)
 Master of Mathematics and Computer Science (MMathCompSci)
 Master of Mathematics and Philosophy (MMathPhil)
 Master of Physics (MPhys)
 Master of Physics and Philosophy (MPhysPhil)

The holders of these degrees have the academic precedence and standing of BAs until the twenty-first term from matriculation, when they rank as MAs. From 2014 graduates with these degrees wear the same academic gown as a Master of Studies, with a black silk hood lined with sand fabric. Previously the academic dress was simply the BA gown and hood, (from 2009, even after achieving MA status). In contrast, science undergraduates at Cambridge may be granted the additional degree of Master of Natural Sciences (MSci) while continuing to be awarded the BA (and the subsequent MA). Note that biology and physiology undergraduates are still awarded the BA/MA, as these are currently three-year courses. All other undergraduates, whether their degree courses last three years or four years, are awarded the BA/MA

Degree of Master of Arts

The degree of Master of Arts is awarded to BAs and BFAs seven years after matriculation, without further examination, upon the payment of a nominal fee. Recipients of undergraduate master's degrees are not eligible to incept as MA, but are afforded the same privileges after the statutory twenty-one terms. This system dates from the Middle Ages, when the study of the liberal arts took seven years.

Postgraduate degrees

Bachelors' degrees

 Bachelor of Divinity (BD)
 Bachelor of Medicine & Bachelor of Surgery (BM, BCh)
 Bachelor of Civil Law (BCL)
 Bachelor of Letters (BLitt) (no longer awarded)
 Bachelor of Science (BSc) (no longer awarded)
 Bachelor of Music (BMus)
 Bachelor of Philosophy (BPhil) (now only awarded in Philosophy)

In medieval times a student could not study some subjects until he had completed his study in the liberal arts. These were known as the higher faculties. The degrees in Science and Letters were added in the 19th century, and the degree in Philosophy was added in 1914. The higher bachelor's degree programme is generally a taught programme of one or two years for graduates. In Medicine and Surgery this corresponds to the clinical phase of training, after which they are accorded the courtesy title "Doctor". The BD and BMus are open only to Oxford graduates who have done well in the BA examinations in divinity and music, respectively. The BPhil/MPhil is a part-taught, part-research degree which is often a stepping stone to the DPhil.

Masters' degrees

 Master of Surgery (MCh)

The MCh is the higher degree in surgery, and is awarded on similar conditions to higher doctorates such as the DM, e.g., ten years must have passed since the lower degree in the faculty. In medieval times the distinction between a master and doctor was not significant, and both words signified the higher degree in a faculty. The title "master" is used instead of "doctor", as surgeons in England are traditionally known as "Mr" rather than "Dr".

 Master of Philosophy (MPhil)
 Master of Letters (MLitt)
 Master of Science (MSc) (awarded by examination or by research)

Due to pressure from employers and overseas applicants to conform with United States practice, which is also that of most other UK universities, the BLitt, BSc, and BPhil (in degrees other than philosophy) were re-titled master's degrees.

 Magister Juris (MJur) 
 Master of Studies (MSt)
 Master of Theology (MTh)
 Master of Business Administration (MBA)
 Master of Education (MEd)
 Master of Fine Arts (MFA)
 Master of Public Policy (MPP)

The MJur and MBA are awarded after taught courses, the MJur being the equivalent of the BCL for students from non-common-law backgrounds. The MSt is a one-year hybrid research/taught course which is the equivalent of the taught master's degree in most other UK universities. The MTh is an applied theology course for those intending to enter holy orders. The degree of Master of Education was formerly awarded to students at Westminster College, when that course was validated by the University.

Diplomas

Historically at the oldest universities in the world (University of Oxford and University of Cambridge), a Diploma was a postgraduate qualification but it has mostly been replaced by the more common master's degree. However, in some cases the naming remains unchanged for historically significant areas or very specialized curriculum (for instance, the Cambridge Diploma in Computer Science retains its archaic name due to its historical significance in the history of computer science). It depends on the programme. However, in many cases at Oxbridge, Diploma is a Master-level qualification and require a thesis (the naming Diploma is used in case of a very specialised area that through learning process is going to be deeply explored). 
E.g. Oxford: Diploma in Geography, J. N. L. Baker (1921), Diploma in Legal Studies, Barney Williams (2004).

Doctorates

 Doctor of Divinity (DD)
 Doctor of Civil Law (DCL)
 Doctor of Medicine (DM)
 Doctor of Letters (DLitt)
 Doctor of Science (DSc)
 Doctor of Music (DMus)

Bachelors in the higher faculties other than Medicine can proceed to a doctorate in the same faculty without further examination, on presentation of evidence of an important contribution to their subject, e.g., published work, research, etc. Doctorates in the higher faculties may also be awarded honoris causa, i.e., as honorary degrees. It is traditional for the Chancellor to be made a DCL jure officio (by virtue of his office). Until the 19th century all bishops who had studied at Oxford were made DDs jure officio.

 Doctor of Philosophy (DPhil)

The DPhil is a research degree, modelled on the German and American PhD, that was introduced in 1914. Rather atypically, Oxford was the first university in the UK to accept this innovation.

 Doctor of Clinical Psychology (DClinPsychol)
 Doctor of Engineering (EngD)

The new degrees of DClinPsychol and EngD are professional degrees in the American model. The EngD is the only Oxford degree to use the Cambridge abbreviation format.

Order of academic standing

Members of the University of Oxford are ranked according to their degree. The order is as follows:

 Doctor of Divinity
 Doctor of Civil Law
 Doctor of Medicine if also a Master of Arts
 Doctor of Letters if also a Master of Arts
 Doctor of Science if also a Master of Arts
 Doctor of Music if also a Master of Arts
 Doctor of Philosophy if also a Master of Arts
 Doctor of Clinical Psychology if also a Master of Arts
 Doctor of Engineering if also a Master of Arts
 Master of Surgery if also a Master of Arts
 Master of Science if also a Master of Arts
 Master of Letters if also a Master of Arts
 Master of Philosophy if also a Master of Arts
 Master of Studies if also a Master of Arts
 Master of Theology if also a Master of Arts
 Master of Education if also a Master of Arts
 Master of Business Administration if also a Master of Arts
 Master of Fine Art if also a Master of Arts
 Master of Public Policy if also a Master of Arts
 Master of Arts, or Master of Biochemistry or Chemistry or Computer Science or Earth Sciences or Engineering or Mathematics or Mathematics and Computer Science or Mathematics and Philosophy or Physics or Physics and Philosophy with effect from the twenty-first term from matriculation
 Doctor of Medicine if not also a Master of Arts
 Doctor of Letters if not also a Master of Arts
 Doctor of Science if not also a Master of Arts
 Doctor of Music if not also a Master of Arts
 Doctor of Philosophy if not also a Master of Arts
 Doctor of Clinical Psychology if not also a Master of Arts
 Doctor of Engineering if not also a Master of Arts
 Master of Surgery if not also a Master of Arts
 Master of Science if not also a Master of Arts
 Master of Letters if not also a Master of Arts
 Master of Philosophy if not also a Master of Arts
 Master of Studies if not also a Master of Arts
 Master of Theology if not also a Master of Arts
 Master of Education if not also a Master of Arts
 Master of Business Administration if not also a Master of Arts
 Master of Fine Art if not also a Master of Arts
 Master of Public Policy if not also a Master of Arts
 Bachelor of Divinity
 Bachelor of Civil Law
 Magister Juris
 Bachelor of Medicine
 Bachelor of Surgery
 Bachelor of Letters
 Bachelor of Science
 Bachelor of Music
 Bachelor of Philosophy
 Bachelor of Arts, or Master of Biochemistry or Chemistry or Computer Science or Earth Sciences or Engineering or Mathematics or Mathematics and Computer Science or Mathematics and Philosophy or Physics or Physics and Philosophy until the twenty-first term from matriculation
 Bachelor of Fine Art
 Bachelor of Theology
 Bachelor of Education

Within each degree the holders are ranked by the date on which they proceeded to their degree. In the case of people who graduated on the same day they are ranked by alphabetical order.

If the Degree of Master of Biochemistry, or Chemistry, or Computer Science, or Earth Sciences, or Engineering, or Mathematics, or Mathematics and Computer Science, or Mathematics and Philosophy, or Physics, or Physics and Philosophy, is held together with a higher degree, the holder will rank in precedence equally with a person who holds the same higher degree together with the Degree of Master of Arts.

See also
 Academic degree
 Bachelor's degree
 Master's degree
 Doctorate
 University of Oxford
 Academic dress of the University of Oxford

References

External links
University of Oxford

Oxford University degrees
Degrees